The Chiltern & District Football Association was first established in 1912 from the following Australian Rules Football clubs - Barnawartha, Chiltern, Chiltern Valley, Christmastown, Southern and Wodonga, in North Eastern Victoria, Australia and was an active competition until 1956 when it was wound up.

History

The Chiltern & District Football Association was first established in 1912 from the following Australian Rules Football clubs - Barnawartha, Chiltern, Chiltern Valley, Christmastown, Southern and Wodonga.

The Southern Football Club was made up of employees from the Great Southern Mine from South Rutherglen.

1500 spectators attended the inaugural grand final match at the Chiltern Park Oval to watch Chiltern Valley defeat Wodonga in 1912.

In 1913, there was much speculation about which club won the minor premiership, with Wodonga FC claiming they had the most goals and points for the season. Three matches were deemed void due to protests and clubs were ordered to replay these matches, just before the finals too. The Southern FC refused to play Wodonga in a semi-final due to an appeal not being decided on,  while the other semi-final matches was played with Brown's Plain defeating United Miners. Finally, the C&DFA Delegates decided to abandoned the season.

The club jumper colours worn in 1919 were as follows - Chiltern: red & white, Chiltern Valley: yellow & blue, Rutherglen: green & gold, Springhurst: blue & white, Wahgunyah: black & white. Rutherglen's senior team played in the Ovens and Murray Football League in 1919.

In 1920, when the Ovens and Murray Football League went into recess, three of the four competing clubs, Howlong, Lake Rovers and Rutherglen joined the C&DFL and the fourth club, Corowa joined the Coreen & District Football League. In June 1920, there was a match between the C&DFA and the Albury Border Football Association. 

Both semi-final matches In 1929 had to be replayed after appeals were lodged by both Chiltern and Rutherglen.

In 1932, A Costin - Howlong & H Scott - Wodonga, tied on 12 votes each for the Rudduck & Co Best and Fairest Award, with Costin eventually winning on a countback.

The 1933 C&DFA grand final saw Wodonga defeat Beechworth Wanderers. Wodonga's Clive Bohr was judged as the best and fairest player in the grand final.

In 1937, Barnawartha's, Leslie A. Winnett, won the Chiltern & DFA best and fairest Award, the Hooper Cup.

The C&DFA club jumper colours in 1939 were - Albury - blue and gold; Balldale, royal Blue and gold braces; Barnawartha - yellow and black; Chiltern - red and white; Corowa - black and red; Howlong - red and blue; Springhurst - red, white and blue.

Towards the end of  World War Two, the C&DFA was re-established in 1945 from the following five teams - Barnawartha, Beechworth, Chiltern, Howlong and Rutherglen, with Chiltern defeating Howlong by eight points in the grand final.

In 1950, Chiltern Footballer, Gerald O’Neil kicked 24 goals against Springhurst in round 16, to bring his goal tally to 116 for the season, with two games to play, plus finals.

Participating Clubs
The following 36 clubs competed in the Chiltern & DFA between 1912 and 1956.
Albury Rovers: 1928 & 1939. Joined the Tallangatta & District Football League in 1929. Went into recess in 1940, then joined the Albury & District Football League in 1946.
Balldale: 1935 to 1940 & 1946. Played in the Hume Football League in 1945, then returned to the Hume Football League from 1947 to 1975.
Bandiana (Army): 1947 to 1951 & 1953 to 1956. Joined the Tallangatta & District Football League in 1952. Rejoined the Tallangatta & District Football League in 1958.
Barnawartha: 1912 to 1915, 1920 to 1940, 1945 to 1956, Joined the Tallangatta & District Football League in 1957.
Beechworth Wanderers: (1930, 1931, 1932, 1933, 1934, 1935. Beechworth Wanderers and Beechworth FC merged and played in the O&KFL from 1936 to 1940 as Beechworth United FC. 1945 - C&DFA, 1954, 
Bethanga: 1956.
Brown Plains: (maroon & blue) 1913 & 1914
Chiltern: 1912 to 1915, 1919 to 1940, 1945 to 1953. Joined the Ovens & King Football League in 1954.
Chiltern Valley: 1912, 1913, 1915, 1919, 1920
Christmastown: 1912, 1915, 1916
Corowa Rovers: 1938 & 1939. Club folded in early 1940, due to World War Two.
Corowa Stars: 1926 to 1929. joined the Corowa & DFA in 1930. Club folded prior to the 1934 season. Re-joined the C&DFA in 1949 to 1952. Joined the Ovens & Murray Football League Reserves competition as “Corowa” in 1953.
Gooramadda: 1920, 1922
Granya: 1936. Applied to join both the Dederang & District Football League & Upper Murray Football Association in 1937, but were refused, so went into recess in 1937 and 1938. Granya joined the Dederang & District Football League in 1939.
Great Southern: 1912 & 1913
Howlong: 1911 to 1914 - O&MFL, 1915 & 1916 - Chiltern & DFA, 1919 - O&MFL, 1923 to 1929 - Chiltern & DFA, 1930 - Corowa & DFA, 1931 to 1940 - Chiltern & DFA, 1946 to 1952. Howlong joined the Hume Football League in 1953.
Howlong Juniors: 1920 to 1922
Howlong United: 1920 to 1922
Kiewa: 1934 to 1936. Kiewa joined the Dederang & District Football League in 1937.
Lake Rovers: 1920. Returned to the O&MFL in 1921. In 1924, Lake Rovers Football Club amalgamated with the Rutherglen Football Club.
Lavington: 1946 to 1956, 1957 - Club sat out the 1957 season awaiting entry to T&DFL in 1958, 1958 - Joined the Tallangatta & District Football League.
Mitta Mitta: 1936. Miita applied to join the Dederang & District Football League in 1937, but were refused and went into recess in 1937
Mount Ophir: 1914
North Albury: 1946. Joined the Ovens and Murray Football League in 1947.
Rutherglen: 1919, 1920 & 1945. Rutherglen re-joined the Ovens and Murray Football League in 1921. Rutherglen played in the C&DFL in 1945, then re-joined the Ovens and Murray Football League in 1946.
Rutherglen Rovers: 1924 to 1933. 
Saint Patrick's Rovers: 1923, 1924, 1954
South Albury: 1949 to 1952. Merged with Albury Football Club and joined the Ovens and Murray Football League Reserves competition in 1953 as "Albury".
 Springhurst 1913, 1919, 1920, 1921 - O&MFL, 1922, (1923 - in recess), 1924, 1926, 1927, 1930, 1933, 1934, 1935, 1936, 1937, (1938 - in recess), 1939, 1950, 1951, 1952, 1953, 1954, 1955 ?, 1956. 
Tallangatta: 1935 & 1936. The club was in recess in 1937 & 1938, before joining the Dederang & District Football League in 1939
United Miners: 1913 to 1915
Wahgunyah: 1919, 1920, 1921 - O&MFL, 1922 - Coreen & DFA, 1923, 1924, 1925, 1926, 1927, 1928, 1929, 1930 - Corowa & DFA, 1931, 1932, 1933, 1934, 1935, 1936, 1937, (1938 - 1946 in recess). Played in the Coreen & District Football League from 1947 to 1949. Returned to the C&DFL in 1950, 1953, 1954, 1955, 1956.
Wangaratta Rovers - Reserves: 1952. Joined the Ovens and Murray Football League Reserves competition in 1953.
Wodonga: 1912, 1913, (1914 - Wodonga DFA), 1915, (1919 to 1923 - Albury & Border FA), 1930 to 1935. Joined the O&MFL in 1936.
Wodonga Ex Servicemen’s FC: 1947. In 1948 they changed their name to Wodonga Rovers FC.
Wodonga Rovers: 1924, 1925, 1926, 1927, 1928. In 1929 they changed their name to Wodonga FC & joined the Tallangatta FA, then returned to the Chiltern & DFA in 1930. 1948 to 1952 - C&DFA. Joined the Ovens and Murray Football League Reserves competition as “Wodonga” in 1953.
Wodonga FC - Seconds: 1940
Yackandandah: 1933 to 1935, 1954, 1956. Joined the Dederang & District FA in 1936.

C&DFA - Honourboard

Chiltern & District Football Association - Best and Fairest Award

The C&DFA - Azzi Medal was initially donated by Mr. Kelly Joseph Azzi. Mr. Azzi was the Balldale FC Delegate and C&DFA Vice President back in 1939. When Balldale FC joined the Hume Football League in 1947,  Mr. Azzi then donated the inaugural best and fairest award medal in the Hume Football League and the award has remained as the Azzi Medal ever since.
The Huggins Medal was donated by Mr. Mervyn C Huggins, the C&DFA President.

Chiltern & DFA - Life Members

 Mervyn C. Huggins

References

External links 
 Chiltern & District Football Association - Grand Final details
 1919 - Chiltern & District F A Premiers: Wahgunyah FC team photo
 1927 - Chiltern & District FA Premiers: Corowa Stars FC team photo
 1928 - Chiltern & District FA Premiers: Albury Rovers FC team photo
 1928 - Chiltern & District FA Premiers: Albury Rovers FC team photo, with names
 1938 - Howlong FC Team Photo
 1938 - Chiltern & District FA Preliminary Final Officials photo
 1938 - Chiltern & District FA defeated Preliminary Finalists: Balldale FC team photo
 1939 - Albury Reserves & Chiltern FC Team Photos
 1939 - Barnawartha FC Team Photo
 1939 - Howlong FC Team Photo
 1939 - Chiltern & DFA Premiers: Howlong FC
 1939 - Chiltern & DFA best & fairest medalist, Clive Waters
 1940 - Chiltern & DFA - Grand Final - Chiltern & Howlong Team Photos
 1945 - Chiltern FC - Team Photo
 1945 - Howlong & Rutherglen FC Team Photos
 1945 - Lavington Football Club Team Photo
 1946 - Walbundrie Knockout Comp Grand Final - Chiltern & Lavington Team Photos
 1946 - North Albury FC - Team Photo
 1947 - Lavington FC team photo
 1948 - Chiltern & District FA Huggins Medal winner: Bob Sharman photo
 1949 - Chiltern & District FA Huggins Medal winner: John Ziebarth photo
 1949 - Chiltern & District FA Premiers: Chiltern FC team photo
 1950 - Chiltern & District FA Premiers: Chiltern FC team photo
 1953 - Chiltern & District FA Premiers: Chiltern FC - Team Photo
 1953 - Chiltern & District FA Premiers: Chiltern FC - Team Photo
 Hume FNL - Hall of Fame Inductee: Kelly J. Azzi
 C&DFA President: Mervyn Huggins photo

Australian rules football competitions
Sports leagues established in 1912
Sports leagues disestablished in 1956